Nine Nine (born Tin Zaw Latt on 2 December 1978) is a Burmese actor. He is best known for his leading roles in several Burmese films. Throughout his career, he has acted as leading actor in over 200 films.

Early life and education
Nine Nine was born on 2 December 1978 in Yangon, Myanmar. He graduated from Yangon University.

Career
Nine Nine entered the modeling world under the name Tin Zaw Latt in 1996 and began his acting career in 1997 under the name Nine Nine from Snow White Film Production. He became known to fans through his TV commercials, magazine covers, journals, newspaper covers and Music Video. Then he starred in many film with various actress.

Filmography

Film
The Moon Lotus (2011)
Mystery of Burma: Beyond the Dotehtawady (2018)
Toxic Man (2018)
Someone (2018)
Two Worlds (2019)
The Only Mom (2019)

Personal life
Nine Nine is married to Sandi Cho on January 12, 2008 at the Sedona Hotel. They have three daughters and one son.

References

External links

Living people
1978 births
Burmese male film actors
21st-century Burmese male actors
People from Yangon